Simon Andrew Deacon (born 3 June 1954) is a former Australian rules footballer who played with St Kilda in the Victorian Football League (VFL).

Notes

External links 

Living people
1954 births
Australian rules footballers from Victoria (Australia)
St Kilda Football Club players
People educated at Melbourne Grammar School